The attack on Kruševac was attack of Yugoslav rebels on Axis-held Kruševac in the German-occupied territory of Serbia which lasted between 23 and 27 September 1941 during World War II.

Background 

In April 1941, Germany and its allies invaded and occupied the Kingdom of Yugoslavia, which was then partitioned. Some Yugoslav territory was annexed by its Axis neighbors, Hungary, Bulgaria and Italy. The Germans engineered and supported the creation of the puppet state, the Independent State of Croatia (NDH), which roughly comprised most of the pre-war Banovina Croatia, along with rest of present-day Bosnia and Herzegovina and some adjacent territory. The Italians, Hungarians and Bulgarians occupied other parts of Yugoslavian territory. Germany did not annex any Yugoslav territory, but occupied northern parts of present-day Slovenia and stationed occupation troops in the northern half of the NDH. The German-occupied part of Slovenia was divided into two administrative areas that were placed under the administration of the neighboring Reichsgaus.

The remaining territory, which consisted of Serbia proper, the northern part of Kosovo (around Kosovska Mitrovica), and the Banat was occupied by the Germans and placed under the administration of a German military government. This was due to the key rail and riverine transport routes that passed through it, and its valuable resources, particularly non-ferrous metals.

On 10 April, the Central Committee of the Communist Party of Yugoslavia (KPJ) had appointed a military committee headed by its secretary-general, Josip Broz Tito. From April, the KPJ had an underground network right across the country, including military committees that were preparing for an opportunity to initiate a revolt. In May, the KPJ outlined its policy of "unity and brotherhood among all peoples of Yugoslavia, [and] relentless struggle against the foreign enemies and their domestic helpers as a matter of sheer survival". On 23 June, immediately following the Axis attack on the Soviet Union, the KPJ decided to launch their armed struggle, and in the following week a KPJ operative visited the Rasina District Committee to organise a detachment of the Yugoslav Partisans. On 22 July, the Rasina Detachment was formed in the forest outside Kruševac, initially of 34 fighters, although there was a serious shortage of weapons. About 200 people had volunteered from the town itself.

In late April, Yugoslav Army Colonel Draža Mihailović and a group of about 80 soldiers, who had not followed the orders to surrender, crossed the Drina river into the occupied territory, having marched cross-country from the area of Doboj, in northern Bosnia, which was now part of the NDH. As they passed near Užice on 6 May, the small group was surrounded and almost destroyed by German troops. His force fragmented, and when he reached the isolated mountain plateau of Ravna Gora, his band had shrunk to 34 officers and men. By establishing ties with the local people, and toleration by the gendarmerie in the area, Mihailović created a relatively safe area in which he could consider his future actions. Soon after arriving at Ravna Gora, Mihailović's troops took the name "Chetnik Detachments of the Yugoslav Army". By the end of May, Mihailović had decided that he would adopt a long-term strategy aimed at gaining control over as many armed groups as possible throughout Yugoslavia, in order to be in a position to seize power when the Germans withdrew or were defeated.

Planning
The attack was ordered by Royal Yugoslav Army Brigadier General Ljubo Novaković. It was planned within larger rebel operations against Axis forces in western Serbia in autumn 1941. At the same time rebels kept Kraljevo under siege and the fall of Kruševac would significantly contribute to the fall of Kraljevo.

According to post war Yugoslav sources, the commander of Stalać Detachment of the so-called Chetnik Detachments of the Yugoslav Army, Lieutenant Colonel Radojević held meetings with Miloje Zakić who was representative of the communist-led Yugoslav Partisan forces. They met two times, once in the village of Slatina on 18 September 1941 and the second time a day later in the village of Bovan and developed a plan to attack Kruševac. According to this plan it was agreed that the date of the attack would be 23 September 1941, that Kruševac would be cut off before the attack, that Keserović and his Chetniks would attack the town from the west and the south, across Bagdala and that Partisans would attack from the north and the east. The Partisan Rasina corps and Chetnik commander Keserović agreed to attack Kruševac together on 23 September 1941.

Forces 
The Chetnik part of the attack was to be conducted by the Rasina Detachment under the command of Dragutin Keserović and the Stalać Detachment under the command of Lieutenant Colonel Radojević. A small unit of Pećanac Chetniks also joined the rebels. The Partisan part of the attack was to be conducted by the Rasina Detachment. The total number of rebels who attacked Kruševac was estimated between 1,000 and 10,000 in different sources while most sources agree on 2—3,000 men. Only 500 rebels were armed with firearms, while other carried melee weapons.

The German garrison in Kruševac totaled 550 soldiers. Out of this number, about 350 soldiers belonged to I. Battalion of the 749th Infantry Regiment of the 717th Infantry Division. The Axis garrison in Kruševac was supported by the Goč Detachment of Pećanac Chetniks with 500 men, on the last day of the battle.

The battle 
The fighting between attacking rebel forces and Axis garrison lasted for four days.

On the first day Keserović's Rasina Detachment attacked the Kruševac garrison from the direction of Bagdala and Rasina. The hardest battle was waged on the first day of the attack when the Chetniks of the Rasina Detachment pushed the German garrison from their positions on the town's periphery to its center and blocked them in three buildings in the town center: the Gymnasium, the Hotel Belgrade and the Town Hall. The Partisan Rasina Detachment was positioned between Obilićevo and the railway in Dedina and was unable to join the initial surprise attack of Chetnik forces on the first day. As soon as the attack on Kruševac began, Kosta Pećanac insisted to cancel it and to cancel the alliance between Chetniks and Partisans. In his order issued on 23 September and in his appeal to Serbs issued on 24 September, Pećanac condemned his own units that participated in the attack on Kruševac.

On the second day of the attack, Keserović canceled the attack, and retreated with his forces and joined other Chetnik units under Brigadier General Ljubo Novaković in their attack on Axis-held Kraljevo. Therefore on the second day of the attack only the Chetnik Stalać Detachment and the small Partisan Rasina Detachment continued their joint attacks on the garrison. On the second day of the attack German forces received reinforcements when German infantry, cavalry and tanks arrived from the Niš garrison.

Although the town was well defended the German garrison had 28 dead and 16 to 20 wounded soldiers, including the captain who was the commander of the German battalion and garrison. On the fourth day of the battle Kosta Pećanac himself and a large force of his Chetniks came to reinforce the Axis garrison. The rebels gave up further attacks after having suffered 17 dead and 74 wounded. Keserović and Radojević issued a resolution and condemned Pećanac and Milan Nedić as traitors and invited people to join "National liberation Chetnik detachments" en masse. Pećanac sentenced Keserović and Radojević to death.

Aftermath 

After the battle the Germans killed between 60 and 80 civilians in a reprisal for the attack. At the end of September rebels published a printed flyer with text criticizing Kosta Pećanac and signed it as the People's Liberation Movement of Chetniks and Partisans. The post-war Yugoslav sources blamed Keserović for the failure of the attack on Kruševac. These sources accuse Keserović of attacking the German garrison earlier than agreed and for halting the attack when Partisan forces joined the attack.

Eventually, Soviet Red Army and Yugoslav communist forces captured Kruševac in Autumn 1944 and established communist regime which lasted for about fifty years.

References

Sources 

 
 
 
 
 
 
 
 
 
 
 

Battles of World War II involving Chetniks
Battles of World War II involving Germany
Yugoslavia in World War II
1941 in Serbia
September 1941 events